Mercury House is an office building at 124, Theobalds Road, Holborn, London, and has been headquarters to Cable & Wireless from 1955. It was opened by John Reith and was named after the Roman god.

The architect was Gordon Jeeves. The interiors were designed by H C Upton, Cable & Wireless's own architect. The three glass panels in the entrance were the work of John Hutton.

Since December 2006 the building has been home to MediaCom.

Office buildings in London
Buildings and structures in the London Borough of Camden